David Crabbe (born c. 1947) was a Canadian football player who played for the Calgary Stampeders. He won the Grey Cup with them in 1971. He played college football at Kent State University in Kent, Ohio.

References

1940s births
Living people
Calgary Stampeders players
Kent State Golden Flashes football players
Canadian football linebackers